Devizes is a market town and civil parish in Wiltshire, England. It developed around Devizes Castle, an 11th-century Norman castle, and received a charter in 1141. The castle was besieged during the Anarchy, a 12th-century civil war between Stephen of England and Empress Matilda, and again during the English Civil War when the Cavaliers lifted the siege at the Battle of Roundway Down. Devizes remained under Royalist control until 1645, when Oliver Cromwell attacked and forced the Royalists to surrender. The castle was destroyed in 1648 on the orders of Parliament, and today little remains of it.

From the 16th century Devizes became known for its textiles, and by the early 18th century it held the largest corn market in the West Country, constructing the Corn Exchange in 1857. In the 18th century, brewing, curing of tobacco, and snuff-making were established. The Wadworth Brewery was founded in the town in 1875.

It has nearly five hundred listed buildings, some notable churches, a town hall and a green in the centre.

History
Devizes Castle was built by Osmund, Bishop of Salisbury in 1080, but the town is not mentioned in the Domesday Book. Because the castle was on the boundaries of the manors of Rowde, Bishops Cannings and Potterne it became known as the castrum ad divisas ("the castle at the boundaries"), hence the name Devizes. On John Speed's map of Wiltshire (1611), the town's name is recorded as The Devyses. The first castle on the site was of the motte and bailey form and was probably made of wood and earth, but this burnt down in 1113.

A new castle was built in stone by Roger of Salisbury, Osmund's successor. Devizes received its first charter in 1141 permitting regular markets. The castle changed hands several times during the Anarchy, a civil war between Stephen of Blois and Matilda in the 12th century. The castle held important prisoners, including (from 1106) Robert Curthose, eldest son of William the Conqueror.

The town has had churches since the 12th century and today has four Church of England parish churches.

During the 12th and 13th centuries, the town of Devizes developed outside the castle with craftsmen and traders setting up businesses to serve the residents of the castle. The first known market in Devizes was in 1228. The original market was in the large space outside St Mary's Church, rather than in the current Market Place, which at that time would have been within the castle's outer bailey. The chief products in the 16th and early 17th centuries were wheat, wool and yarn, with cheese, bacon and butter increasing in importance later.

In 1643, during the English Civil War, Parliamentary forces under Sir William Waller besieged Royalist forces under Sir Ralph Hopton in Devizes. However the siege was lifted by a relief force from Oxford under Henry Wilmot, 1st Earl of Rochester and Waller's forces were almost totally destroyed at the Battle of Roundway Down. Devizes remained under Royalist control until 1645, when Oliver Cromwell attacked and forced the Royalists to surrender. The castle was destroyed in 1648 on the orders of Parliament, a process known as slighting, and today little remains of it.

From the 16th century Devizes became known for its textiles, initially white woollen broadcloth but later the manufacture of serge, drugget, felt and cassimere or Zephyr cloth. In the mid 18th century Devizes held the largest corn market in the West Country of England and also traded hops, cattle, horses and various types of cloth. Before the Corn Exchange was built in 1857, the trade in wheat and barley was conducted in the open, with sacks piled around the market cross. Today's cross displays the tale of a woman, Ruth Pierce, who dropped dead suddenly after being discovered cheating.

Wool merchants were able to build prosperous town houses in St. John's and Long Street and around the market place. From the end of the 18th century the manufacture of textiles declined, but other trades in the town included clock-making, a bell foundry, booksellers, milliners, grocers and silversmiths. In the 18th century brewing, curing of tobacco and snuff-making were established in the town. Brewing still survives in the Wadworth Brewery, but the tobacco and snuff trades have now died out.

The pond known as The Crammer, east of the town centre, is claimed to be site of the 18th-century Moonrakers story which led to a colloquial name for Wiltshire people.

In 1794 it was decided in the Bear Hotel to raise a body of ten independent troops of yeomanry in the county of Wiltshire.  These would later be brought together to form the Royal Wiltshire Yeomanry, the senior yeomanry regiment. In 1810 the county Militia, quartered at Devizes, mutinied and the Royal Wiltshire Yeomanry were called out to quell the disturbances. The mutiny came to a head when the two forces faced off against each other with loaded firearms in the Market Square, at which point the Militia ringleaders surrendered. The Royal Wiltshire Yeomanry went on to serve at home and abroad, including in the Boer War, World War I and World War II, and live on as B (RWY) Squadron and Y (RWY) Squadron of the Royal Wessex Yeomanry, based in Old Sarum and Swindon respectively.

A new Devizes Prison, or "County House of Corrections", was opened in 1817. This replaced the Old Bridewell that had been built in Bridewell Street in 1579. The new prison was built of brick and stone, it was designed by Richard Ingleman as a two-storey polygon surrounding a central governor's house. It had an operational life of more than ninety years and was closed in 1922. It stood on the north side of the Castle's Old Park, across the Kennet and Avon Canal by way of a bridge still called Prison Bridge. The House of Corrections was demolished by 1928.

Devizes has more than 500 listed buildings, a large number for a town of its size. The Trust for Devizes has a Town Trail map which provides a guide to many of them. 17 Market Place is a substantial Grade I listed house from the early 18th century. In the centre of the Market Place is the Market Cross, rebuilt in 1814 to designs of James Wyatt. Brownston House is another Grade I house, on New Park Street; it has been home to four MPs, two Army Generals from 1700, and a young ladies' boarding school from 1859 to 1901. It was conserved in 1976 by Wiltshire Council and is now a business head office. Heathcote House on the Green in Devizes is a Grade II* listed building; its history is associated with the church and education. No 8 Long Street was the house of the clothier Samuel Powell, as well as Admiral Joseph Tayler, one of the inspirations for C.S. Forester's fictional hero Horatio Hornblower. Southbroom House, close to the Green, was built in 1501, then burnt down and was rebuilt by the Eyles family in 1772; it is now at the heart of Devizes School.

The town was a coaching stop for Mail coaches and stagecoaches on the road from London to Bristol, as evidenced by the number of coaching inns in the town. The Kennet and Avon Canal, fully open by 1810, passes through Devizes. The town gained a railway station in 1857 but the line was closed in 1966.

In 1853 the Wiltshire Archaeological and Natural History Society was founded in the town, and later opened a museum in Long Street. Now called the Wiltshire Museum, its collections are designated as being of national significance. The museum has extensive Bronze Age collections and includes finds from the Stonehenge and Avebury World Heritage Site, including West Kennet Long Barrow, Marden Henge and Bush Barrow.

There was a military presence in the town at Le Marchant Barracks, from 1878 until the 1980s.

In 1999, a hill figure of a white horse was cut onto a hill close to Roundway Hill. Known as the Devizes White Horse, it replaced an earlier one which was cut in 1845.

In 2014, the town celebrated the 200th anniversary of the Market Cross, marked by Viscount Sidmouth and his cousin, High Sheriff of Wiltshire Peter Addington.

Geography

Devizes is 90 miles (145 km) west-southwest of central London, lying almost 2° west of the Greenwich Meridian, with the two-degree line running through the western edge of the town, just a few hundred yards west of the castle.  As this is the centre of the east–west extent of the Ordnance Survey mapping grid, True North and Grid north align exactly in Devizes.

Towns close to Devizes include Melksham, Pewsey and Westbury.

Suburbs of the town include Hartmoor, Jump Farm, Nursteed, Roundway, Southbroom and Wick.

Governance

Devizes is a civil parish with an elected town council. As of 2017, 13 councillors are Devizes Guardians, 6 Conservatives, 1 Labour and 1 Independent. The parish includes the small settlement of Dunkirk, on the northeastern slopes of the hill, which was transferred from Rowde parish in 1835. Much of the built-up area of the town, to the north, east, and south, is within the neighbouring civil parish of Roundway, while a smaller part is in Bishops Cannings parish, and each of those has its own parish council. In April 2017, Roundway and Devizes elected for the first time a joint parish council; at the same time, adjustments to the boundary with Bishops Canning were made.

The town is within the area of the Wiltshire Council unitary authority, on which the four elected members for Devizes are Conservatives. Most significant local government services are the responsibility of Wiltshire Council, while the town and parish councils have a more consultative role. Before the Local Government Act took effect in 1974, Devizes was a municipal borough with its headquarters at Devizes Town Hall. It then became the administrative centre for the much larger District of Kennet, until that was abolished as part of the 2009 structural changes.

The town has four electoral wards. The North and East wards follow the boundaries of the civil parish, while Devizes and Roundway South ward extends southward to include part of the original Roundway parish, the remainder of which makes up the fourth ward, Roundway. The total population of these wards at the 2011 census was 12,491 but in 2017 with the addition of Roundway as the fourth ward, the population grew to over 17,700.

Devizes is part of the Devizes constituency, represented in the House of Commons by one Member of Parliament elected by the first past the post system. The current Member is Danny Kruger of the Conservatives, who was first elected in 2019.

The council have twinning associations with Mayenne in France, Oamaru in New Zealand, Tornio in Finland, and Waiblingen in Germany.

Economy
Devizes has always been a market town and the market square is still used for that purpose every Thursday, and for farmers' markets on the first Saturday of each month. Indoor traders set up each day in the historic Shambles, off the market square.

There are over 70 independent retailers in the town centre, many around the Market Place, Little Brittox and Brittox (both pedestrianised), and in Sidmouth Street. At the town's wharf on the canal, the Kennet and Avon Canal Trust has a small museum and cafe.

Construction of the new Devizes Health Centre, a 1,588sq m, two-storey building, began in 2021.  This will replace the services at Devizes Community Hospital and provide a range of outpatient and GP services.

Culture 
There is a lively arts and culture community in the town, with the Arts Council funded Devizes International Street Festival attracting thousands to the town for two weeks leading up to August Bank Holiday each year, beginning with a long-standing "confetti battle" where, at a given signal – usually cannons firing confetti hundreds of metres into the air – the public are invited into the Market Place to throw as much confetti as possible at one another.

The annual Devizes Arts Festival has a broad spectrum of musical events, poets and authors, literary talks, comedians and other performers. Past performers and acts include John Simpson, Fay Weldon, The Real Thing, Barb'd Wire ska band, Neville Staple band and the String Sisters. Each autumn, the Devizes Food & Drink Festival includes opportunities to dine in unusual places.

There is an active thespian community that performs at the Wharf Theatre, a former warehouse alongside canal.

Transport

In 1857 the Great Western Railway built its Devizes branch line eastward to Devizes, from Holt Junction on its - line, to a station just south of the market place. Pans Lane Halt, southeast of the town in the suburb of Wick, opened in 1929. The building of a by-pass line through Westbury in 1900 diverted most traffic from the Devizes line and British Rail closed it in 1966; the station was demolished soon after.

Devizes has bus connections to surrounding towns including Swindon (via Avebury), Trowbridge, Salisbury, Bath and Chippenham, each of which have rail services. Devizes also has a daily National Express coach service to and from London Victoria, via Heathrow Airport. There is a regular bus service to and from Stonehenge.

Several main roads pass through the town, including the A360, A361 and A342.

The Kennet and Avon Canal was built under the direction of John Rennie between 1794 and 1810, linking Devizes with Bristol and London. Near Devizes the canal rises  by means of 29 locks, 16 of them in a straight line at Caen Hill. In the early days the canal was lit by gas lights at night, enabling boats to negotiate the locks at any time of day. The canal fell into disuse after the coming of the railways in the 1840s, but was restored between 1970 and 2003 for leisure uses. The Kennet and Avon Canal Trust run a museum at The Wharf in Devizes. The town is the starting point of the annual Devizes to Westminster International Canoe Marathon.

National Cycle Route 4 follows the canal towpath through the town.

Education
Devizes School, a secondary school with a sixth form, takes pupils from the town and surrounding area. It is situated in the grounds of the Southbroom House estate and the Grade II listed house forms its administrative core. The school's logo is a lion, in commemoration of the circus lions that were found on the school grounds in 1980.

Downland School is a Community Special School for boys aged 11–16. Braeside is an outdoor education centre run by Wiltshire Council.

Devizes has six primary schools: St Joseph's Catholic Primary School, Southbroom St James Academy, Southbroom Infants' School, Wansdyke Community School, Nursteed Community Primary School and The Trinity CofE (VA) Primary School. Nearby is Rowde CofE Primary Academy in the adjacent village of Rowde.

Long Street has had a number of private schools, beginning in the 18th century and proliferating in the 19th. Brownston House, a Grade I listed building, was the home of Miss Bidwell's Ladies Boarding School from 1859 to 1901. A private Devizes Grammar School was established in Heathcote House in 1874 by the Reverend S.S. Pugh and carried on until 1919 by his twin sons.

The closest third-level institution is the University of Bath.

Religious sites 

Devizes has four Church of England parish churches, and has had nonconformist congregations since the 17th century.

Church of England 
The two 12th-century churches, St. John's and St. Mary's, are Grade I listed buildings. They serve the parish of St. John with St. Mary which has always had one rector.

St. John's stands close to Devizes Castle and may have begun as its chapel. The oldest parts of the building are from 1130, shortly after Roger, Bishop of Salisbury rebuilt the castle. Pevsner writes "A major Norman church, dominated by a mighty crossing tower ...". The western part of the church was rebuilt in the 15th century. restoration was carried out in 1844 and 1862–3, including the west front designed by Slater. The ornate Beauchamp south chapel is similar to the 1492 Beauchamp and Tocotes chapel at Bromham; the north Lamb chapel has a fine panelled ceiling. The organ case is late 17th century.

St. Mary's was built in the 12th century to serve the town outside the castle walls. Only the chancel survives, the rest being rebuilt in the 15th century, including the fine west tower. The east window is from 1852, and there was restoration in 1854 (Carpenter and Slater) and 1875–6. Since c. 2010, St. Mary's Parochial Church Council have been exploring conversion of the church into a performance and community venue.

The church of St. James, Southbroom, stands on the edge of the green, next to the pond known as the Crammer. It was a chapelry of St Mary's, Bishops Cannings until 1832. The civil parish of Bishops Cannings extended as far as the church until 1835, when the boundaries of Devizes borough were expanded. St. James's is first recorded in 1461. The tower is 15th-century while the body of the church was rebuilt in 1831–2; the east window is by Wailes. After completion of the Le Marchant Barracks in 1878, St. James's became the garrison church of the Wiltshire Regiment. The building is Grade II* listed and underwent an internal re-ordering in 2008. Today the church is evangelical in style.

St. Peter's Church, west of the town centre, was built in 1865–6 to designs of Slater & Carpenter; the south aisle was added in 1884. St Peter's is Anglo-Catholic, with episcopal oversight by the Bishop of Ebbsfleet.

Other denominations 
The Catholic church of Our Lady of the Immaculate Conception was opened in 1865 and extended in 1909. St. Joseph's Catholic Primary School is adjacent to the church.

Maryport Street Baptist Chapel, which was built in 1780 and extended in 1785, 1818, 1864 and 1922, continues in use.

Salem Chapel, New Park Street, was built in 1838 by a pastor and followers from Maryport Street, who had left because of divisions in the congregation. They rejoined the parent body in 1895 and the building was used by the Open Brethren, later by Devizes Christian Fellowship and (since the mid 1980s) Rock Community Church.

The New Baptist Church was opened in 1852 during the pastorship of Charles Stanford. It replaced an adjacent Presbyterian chapel of 1791, which had been shared with disenchanted Baptist members from Maryport Street. The church continues in use as Sheep Street Baptist Church.

St. Andrew's Church, Long Street, was built as a Methodist chapel in 1898, replacing an earlier chapel at New Park Street. It is now a combined Methodist and United Reformed Church.

The old Methodist Chapel in New Park Street was then used by the Salvation Army for many years until it was demolished.  The Salvation Army then raised funds to build a hall on Station Road which opened in 1971; the Scout Hut on Southbroom Road was a temporary home in the late 1960s after the New Park Street hall was condemned. The Corps was closed in the 2010s, membership having dwindled from a peak in the 1970s, ending around one hundred years of association with Devizes.

A chapel was built at Northgate Street in 1776, at first for Calvinist Methodist worship, soon becoming Congregationalists. The building was enlarged in 1790 and extended in Early English style in the mid-19th century, becoming known as St Mary's Congregational Church; from 1842 Devizes was the head of the Wiltshire and East Somerset Congregational Union. The congregation joined St. Andrew's around 1987 and the building is now in residential use.

Quakers have a meeting room at Sussex Wharf, next to the canal.

Emergency services
Devizes is policed by Wiltshire Police, who have their headquarters on London Road in the town. Policing of Devizes was the responsibility of the City of Salisbury Police until Wiltshire Constabulary was founded in 1839 under the County Police Act 1839. It was the first county police force founded in the country, hence its motto 'Primus et Optimus – The First and The Best'. The force is one of the largest employers in the town.

The headquarters site also houses the emergency control centre for police services in the county, in a building opened in 2003 by the Wiltshire Emergency Services partnership as a centre for all three emergency services, but since 2013 used only by the police. The headquarters building has housed the office of the Wiltshire Police and Crime Commissioner since the creation of that post in 2012. Wiltshire Air Ambulance was based at the police headquarters site until 2018.

Healthcare and ambulance response services in Devizes are provided by the National Health Service.  South Western Ambulance Service have an ambulance station in Devizes.

Fire and rescue services in Devizes are provided by Dorset and Wiltshire Fire and Rescue Service, who have a fire station with a retained staff. They also have a training centre on the Hopton industrial estate.

Sport
Each year at Easter the  Devizes to Westminster International Canoe Marathon is held on a course between Devizes and Westminster in London. First contested in 1948, the event was one of the first to be included on the international race calendar when marathon canoeing gained worldwide popularity in the 1960s.

The local association football (soccer) team is Devizes Town F.C. who play in the Wiltshire Football League.

The local rugby union team is Devizes R.F.C. founded in 1876, known as the 'Saddlebacks' (after the Wessex Saddleback), who play in the Regional 2 South Central League.

Devizes Cricket Club, founded in 1850, play in the Premier tier of the West of England Premier League. The ladies team was founded in 2013.

Devizes Hockey Club plays in the Premier 1 Hockey League.

Notable people

Sir Harold Walter Bailey (1899–1996), eminent scholar of Khotanese, Sanskrit and the comparative study of Iranian languages
James Bittner (b. 1982), professional footballer, played for Plymouth Argyle
David Domoney (b. 1963), Chartered Horticulturalist and television gardener, co-presenter of Love Your Garden
Fanny Duberly (1829–1902), soldier's wife who accompanied her husband during the Crimean War and the Indian Mutiny
Paul Fletcher (b. 1965), member of the Australian Parliament, former Morrison Government and Turnbull Government Minister and, as of 2022, Manager of Opposition Business in the House of Representatives, born at Devizes
A. W. Lawrence (1900–1991), classical historian and brother of T. E. Lawrence, lived in Devizes with fellow archaeologist Margaret Guido from 1986 until his death in 1991
Sir Thomas Lawrence (1769–1830), artist
Simon May (b. 1944), songwriter
Clive Robertson (b. 1965), actor
Andy Scott (b. 1949), lead guitarist of the band Sweet
William Heath Strange (1837–1907), physician and founder of Hampstead General Hospital, now the Royal Free Hospital
William Sylvester (1831–1920), recipient of the Victoria Cross

References

External links

Devizes – for visitors and residents
Devizes Town Council
Devizes at Wiltshire Community History

 
Market towns in Wiltshire
Towns in Wiltshire
Civil parishes in Wiltshire
Kennet and Avon Canal